Virtual Melton is the distance education platform of the Melton Centre for Jewish Education at The Hebrew University of Jerusalem. The platform is hosted at the Mount Scopus Campus of the University, in Jerusalem, Israel. The site runs on an updated version of the Moodle open source distance learning platform.

Virtual Melton is used for four main purposes:

Hosting online courses in English, Hebrew, Russian and Spanish.
Hosting interactive sites for past, present and future Conferences at the Melton Centre for Jewish Education.
Hosting free-access videos of academic lectures given by visiting scholars and faculty at the Melton Centre for Jewish Education.
Hosting useful technology resources for the Faculty.

Online courses in English on Judaism, Israel and Jewish Education 

There are currently 7 online courses in English:
Four Roads to Israel by Dr. Marc Silverman
The Philosophy of Jewish Education by Dr. Alick Isaacs.
Experiential Learning: Bridging theory and practice for the purposes of Israel education by Dr. Daniel M. Held
Bringing Coherence to the Work of Israel Education in Schools by Dr. Alex Pomson
Ethnography and Jewish Education by Dr. Zvi Bekerman
Social Entrepreneurship and Jewish Education by Dr. Jonathan Mirvis
Achievements, Challenges and opportunities in North American Jewish Education by Dr. Howard Deitcher

Online courses in Spanish on Judaism, Israel and Jewish Education 

The faculty at the Melton Centre for Jewish Education, in a joint effort with the Jewish Agency, has developed a series of tutored online courses in Spanish open to the public for a fee in the framework of the Jewish Distance Studies Center (Centro de Estudios Judaicos a Distancia para Adultos). Soon they will be also available in English. The full list of courses is shown below:

Introduction to Jewish Thought by Dr. Michael Gillis.
Educational Approaches to Ethics and Morality in the Bible by Dr. Jen Glaser.
Approaches for the Understanding of Holidays and their Teaching by Dr. Michael Gillis.
The People of Israel: from slavery to freedom.
Chosen Texts from the Major Prophets.
Second Temple Judaism: a Key to Understanding Historical Judaism by Dr. Adolfo Roitman.
Jewish History in the Middle Ages by Dr. Aliza Moreno.
Jewish History in the Modern Era by Yuval Kovarsky.
Introduction to Contemporary Judaism: the Jewish People in our days by Dr. Yossi Goldstein.
Introduction to Israeli Society by Dr. Yossi Goldstein.

To register in the courses visit The Melton Centre's Website.

Courses in Spanish for senior Jewish educators 
Visions on Jewish education
Mekorot - Using Jewish sources in education.

Course in Russian 
Bereshit Rabbah - Prof. Reuven Kiperwasser.

External links 
Virtual Melton platform
The Melton Centre for Jewish Education
The Hebrew University in Jerusalem

Hebrew University of Jerusalem
Jewish education
E-learning